Sean Lane (or similar) may refer to:

Sean Lane, plaintiff in Lane v. Facebook, Inc.
Sean Lane (footballer) (born 1964), English footballer
Shawn Lane (1963–2003), American musician
Shaun Lane (born 1994), Australian rugby league footballer